"Love Like This" is a song by American singer Faith Evans. It was written by Evans, Ron "Amen-Ra" Lawrence, Sean "Puffy" Combs, Clarence Emery, and Schon Crawford for her second studio album Keep the Faith (1998), with production helmed by Lawrence and Combs. The song is built around a looped sample from "Chic Cheer" (1978) by American band Chic. Due to the inclusion of the sample, band members Bernard Edwards and Nile Rodgers are also credited as songwriters. "Love Like This" initially impacted US radios on September 15, 1998 as the album's lead single.

Commercially, "Love Like This" became one of Evans's biggest successes: It charted within the top forty in New Zealand and the United Kingdom and peaked at number seven on the US Billboard Hot 100, marking her highest-charting solo single to date. On the component Hot R&B Singles & Tracks chart, the song reached number 2; it was eventually certified gold by the Recording Industry Association of America (RIAA). Also a critical success, the song was nominated for Best Female R&B Performance at the 2000 Grammy Awards ceremony, "Love Like This", in turn, was later heavily sampled on American rapper Fatman Scoop's "Be Faithful".

Critical reception
Chuck Taylor from Billboard called "Love Like This" a "surprisingly bouncy, retro-vibed jam that borrows a tasty riff or two from Chic's "Chic Cheer." A nice change of pace for this revered soul balladeer, "Love Like This" also crackles with some smooth guitar work and a vocal that purrs with moist sensuality. Evans sounds like she's having an absolute blast here,  and her positive energy is downright contagious. Allmusic editor Jose F. Promis declared "Love Like This" an "irresistible dance/R&B cut." In his review of parent album Keep the Faith, Ernest Hardy from Rolling Stone wrote that of "the three midtempo tracks, the best is the first single, "Love Like This"." In 2018, Billboard ranked the album 43rd on its retrospective The 98 Greatest Songs of 1998: Critics' Picks listing, writing: "As soon as you hear the mesmerizing opening beats, you can't help but rock to what's since become a party, club, and skating-rink mainstay."

Music video
The song's music video, directed by Hype Williams, depicts people at a colorful skating rink with Evans' singing on a platform in the center. It features actress Countess Vaughn and former child actor Marcus T. Paulk, both from the UPN sitcom Moesha, in cameos. The music video was filmed shortly after the birth of Evans's third child Joshua, so her stylists were forced to use duct tape to make sure she could fit into the outfits for the shoot.

Track listings

Credits and personnel 
Credits adapted from the liner notes of Keep the Faith.

 Prince Charles Alexander – recording
 Sean Combs – producer, writer
 Schon Crawford – writer
 Bernard Edwards – writer (sample)
 Clarence Emery – writer

 Faith Evans – vocals, writer
 Ron "Amen-Ra" Lawrence – producer, writer
 Axel Niehaus – mixing
 Nile Rodgers  – writer (sample)

Charts

Weekly charts

Year-end charts

Certifications

References

1997 songs
1998 singles
Bad Boy Records singles
Faith Evans songs
Songs written by Sean Combs
Songs written by Bernard Edwards
Songs written by Nile Rodgers
Music videos directed by Hype Williams
Songs written by Faith Evans